Duronto TV is a Bangladeshi Bengali-language satellite and cable children's television channel, and the first of its kind in the country. It was initially licensed in 2013 as "Renaissance TV", but was later renamed to its current name. The channel began test broadcasts on 5 October 2017, and later commenced official broadcasts ten days later on 15 October 2017. 

Duronto TV is the first Bengali-language children's television channel. The channel's Director is Abhijit Chowdhury, along with Mohammad Ali Haider being the head of programming and Amjad Hossain Arjo being the head of marketing. It is owned by Barind Media Limited, a subsidiary of Renaissance Group. Duronto TV's programming consists of live action, usually local, and animated shows, usually foreign.

History

Licensing and initiation 
In November 2013, the Bangladesh Telecommunication Regulatory Commission (BTRC) granted Barind Media Limited a license to broadcast "Renaissance TV", which would be Bangladesh's first children's oriented television channel. However, over time, the channel was renamed to Duronto TV. The channel received its frequency allocation in January 2015. Before its launch, in July 2017, Duronto TV, along with four other television channels in Bangladesh, signed an agreement with UNICEF to air children's programming for one minute.

Launch 
On 5 October 2017, Duronto TV began broadcasting as the first Bengali-language children's television channel. Its logo, consisting of the Bengali text, "দুরন্ত", next to a CGI-animated tiger, was also unveiled that day at the Pan Pacific Sonargaon hotel in Dhaka. Bangladesh's then minister of information, Hasanul Haq Inu, had stated that Bangladesh was behind in many sectors, and a television channel specifically for children was in need so they can bring the country ahead in the future. The channel officially began broadcasting on 15 October of that year.

The channel's initial programming line consisted of local live action shows alongside animated programming. Over time, more programming got added to the channel, by grouping them as 'seasons', such as with 'Season 2' that debuted on 14 January 2018. On 15 April 2018, Duronto's third season debuted, with the premiere of local shows, such as Bhuter Baksho and Adbhut, and acquired animated shows such as Justin Time and Spike Team. On 15 July 2018, Duronto's fourth season debuted, with the premiere of three local shows, which are Shohor Theke Dure, Panchabhuj, and Khatta Mitha, and animated shows such as Alisa Knows What to Do!, Bob the Builder, Messy Goes to OKIDO, and Rainbow Ruby.

The channel aired the first three films from the Home Alone film series in October 2018. On 14 April 2019, the popular Nickelodeon television series, SpongeBob SquarePants, debuted on Duronto TV, as a part of its seventh season. Sisimpur began airing on Duronto in July 2019. BBC signed a licensing deal with Duronto TV for a localized version of Mastermind titled Mastermind Family Bangladesh, which premiered on 13 October 2019, as a part of the channel's ninth season which debuted on the same day. On 12 January 2020, its tenth season debuted, with the premiere of shows such as The Magic Roundabout, Mini Ninjas, and The Garfield Show.

Duronto's twelfth season debuted on 12 July 2020, with the premiere of Animesh Aich's Boka Bhoot, along with animated shows Pororo the Little Penguin and Yakari. On 11 October 2020, Duronto's thirteenth season began with the premiere of The Adventures of Tintin, The Minimghty Kids, Bobby and Bill, and Florrie's Dragons on the channel. On 10 January 2021, Duronto's fourteenth season debuted, with the premiere of three local shows, which are Bhulostein, Kattush Kuttush, and Laal Kohinoor, and two animated shows, which are Martin Morning and Zigby.

On 1 March 2021, The Penguins of Madagascar and Kung Fu Panda: Legends of Awesomeness debuted on the channel,  as a part of its fifteenth season which debuted on 11 April. The channel's sixteenth season debuted on 1 August 2021, with the premiere of Rolie Polie Olie, Dora the Explorer, Top Wing, and Franklin and Friends. On 1 November 2021, Duronto's seventeenth season debuted, with the premiere of two educational series, The English Club and Banan Maane Spelling. From 28 November to 2 December 2021, Duronto TV had premiered five Iranian films.

On 30 January 2022, Duronto TV's eighteenth season debuted, with the premiere of two Nickelodeon animated series Blaze and the Monster Machines, Bubble Guppies, and others. In March 2022, Bangladesh's Health Ministry and UNICEF developed a cooking show for young chefs titled Shorno Chef, which premiered on the channel. On 1 May 2022, Duronto TV's nineteenth season debuted, with the premiere of two new drama series, Dui e Dui e Char and Elating Belating, and Nickelodeon animated series Paw Patrol. Duronto TV won the Best TV Program (Kids) award at the Bangladesh Media Innovation Awards 2022 held in September 2022. The twenty-first season of Duronto TV debuted on 30 October, with the premiere of shows such as Mojar Kando Taekwondo, Dadur Jadoo, and The Smurfs.

FR Tower fire and temporary closure 
As a result of a fire breaking out at the FR Tower in Banani, Dhaka, Duronto TV, along with the unrelated radio station Radio Today, were both temporarily taken off the air on 28 March 2019. Both later resumed transmissions over time.

Programming 
Duronto TV's programming mainly consists of shows relating to drama, historical, cultural, travel, magic, science, sports, family, and others. Alongside local programming, which is mostly live action, the channel's lineup also features acquired foreign television series and films, mainly Hollywood and animated, dubbed in Bengali, such as SpongeBob SquarePants, Despicable Me 2, and others. It also airs special programs during certain occasions, such as the cooking show, Banai Iftar Ma-Baba Ar Ami, and quiz show regarding Islam, Janar Ache Onek Kichu, both being aired during the holy month of Ramadan. It broadcasts the national anthem of Bangladesh, Amar Shonar Bangla, everyday during mornings, before moving onto its regular schedule.

Original programming 
 Adbhut - A couple of children are on a mission to destroy a magician who captivates the residents of Abhaynagar.
 Ba-te Bondhu - Two brothers, Bony and Bunty, and their neighbor, Bubly, befriend each other.
 Banan Maane Spelling - A spelling bee series.
 Bhulostein - With its name being a pun of Albert Einstein, the series circulates around 'Bhulostein' and his assistant "Piku" telling scientific stories and doing experiments.
 Bhuter Baksho - A horror television series.
 Cholo Jai Jai Jai
 Chutir Dine
 Dui e Dui e Char
 Duronto Cricket
 Duronto Somoy
 Dushtu Mishti
 Elating Belating
 Golpo Sheshe Ghumer Deshe
 Hablu Gablu - A comedy television series about two brothers who are adults yet childish, along with their pet Pakhi Bondhu.
 Hoi Hoi Holla
 Icchedana - Portrays the lives of girls in Bangladesh.
 Janar Ache Onek Kichu - Only broadcast during Ramadan, it is a quiz show regarding Islam, the predominant religion in Bangladesh.
 Kabil Kohkafi
 Kattush Kuttush - Regarding two book worms that literally eat book pages.
 Khatta Mitha - A puppetry television series involving two friends who live in the same locality.
 Khoka Theke Bangabandhu - Circulating around the life of Bangladesh's founding father, Sheikh Mujibur Rahman.
 Laal Kohinoor
 Maa Babai Sera
 Mastermind Family Bangladesh - The Bangladeshi adaptation of Mastermind produced by BBC.
 Naacher Ishkool
 Panchabhuj
 Rong Beronger Golpo
 Shohor Theke Dure
 Shonar Kathi Rupar Kathi
 Shopno Akar Dol
 Surer Bhela
 The English Club - Helps children to learn the English language.
 Tirigiri Tokka - An alien by the name of 'Tirigiri Tokka' appears in front of a girl named Shurjomukhi, and wants to prevent the Earth from pollution and further destruction.

Acquired programming

Live-action 
 The Art Room
 Sisimpur
 Splatalot!

Animated 
 Alisa Knows What to Do!
 Babar and the Adventures of Badou
 Balloopo
 Blaze and the Monster Machines
 Bob the Builder
 Bobby and Bill
 Bubble Guppies
 Chaplin & Co
 Conni
 Chronokids
 Clay Kids
 Crafty Kids Club
 Dora the Explorer
 Dragon Hunters
 Eddy and the Bear
 Eena Meena Deeka
 Ella Bella Bingo
 Florrie's Dragons
 Franklin and Friends
 Guess What?
 Hareport
 Heidi
 Justin Time
 Kate & Mim-Mim
 Kung Fu Panda: Legends of Awesomeness
 Lassie
 Little Charmers
 Little Monsters
 Lucas & Emily
 Martin Morning
 Maya the Bee
 Messy Goes to OKIDO
 Mini Ninjas
 Minuscule
 Nella the Princess Knight
 Ozie Boo!
 Paw Patrol
 Pororo the Little Penguin
 Rainbow Ruby
 Rolie Polie Olie
 Rusty Rivets
 Spike Team
 SpongeBob SquarePants
 Teenage Mutant Ninja Turtles
 The Adventures of Tintin
 The Backyardigans
 The Care Bears Family
 The Garfield Show
 The Happets
 The Jungle Book
 The Magic Roundabout
 The Minimighty Kids
 The Penguins of Madagascar
 The Ugly Duckling and Me!
 Tip the Mouse
 Top Wing
 Tree Fu Tom
 Wissper
 WordGirl
 Zigby

References

External links

Television channels in Bangladesh
Television channels and stations established in 2017
2017 establishments in Bangladesh
Television in Bangladesh
Children's television networks